Associazione Sportiva Dilettantistica Kaos Futsal is a futsal club based in Bologna, Emilia-Romagna, Italy.

Current squad

Famous players
 Kakà

External links
Official Website
Divisione Calcio a 5

Futsal clubs in Italy
Sport in Emilia-Romagna
1983 establishments in Italy
Sports clubs established in 1983